Bangladesh University of Business and Technology or BUBT is a private university in Bangladesh, located in Mirpur, Dhaka, Bangladesh.  The university was established under the Private University Act 1992. BUBT is regulated by the Bangladesh University Grants Commission (UGC).

BUBT was founded in 2003 under the authority of the Private University Act and was approved by the University Grants Commission (UGC) and the Ministry of Education, Government of Bangladesh. It was modeled after North American universities. It started its operation in the Dhaka Commerce College campus, the founder organization of BUBT, in 2019 campus permanently shifted. Now It is running its all programs in its own campus at Rupnagar R/A, Mirpur 2. In 2011 UGC has ranked BUBT as one of the best eight private universities. Around 1,000 students were awarded with their graduate and post graduate degrees in the first convocation this year (2011). BUBT is a member of the Association of Commonwealth Universities.

Campus

Bangladesh University of Business and Technology (BUBT) is situated at Rupnagar, Mirpur-2, Dhaka, adjacent to Dhaka Commerce College, the National Zoo, Sher e Bangla National Cricket Stadium with four spacious buildings and with all facilities for higher education. It is surrounded by a good number of educational institutions in an excellent academic atmosphere. The campus of BUBT has excellent communication links from all parts of Dhaka City as well as from outside the city by cars, buses, taxies, rickshaws, etc.

Scholarships and waivers 
There are provisions for scholarships, stipends and tuition fee waivers for the students in BUBT.

 Scholarships, stipends and fee waivers are awarded to a minimum of 6% of students of the university on the basis of need and merit.
 100 percent fee waiver is awarded to the sons and daughters of Freedom Fighters.
 For Undergraduate Programs special tuition fee waiver from 25% to 100% based on the total GPA of the SSC and the HSC Examination results, is given for the first year (three semesters).
 For subsequent semesters tuition fee waiver is also given on the basis of the examination results of each semester at BUBT.
 Students of Dhaka Commerce College and  Principal Kazi Faruky School & College are allowed an additional 20 percent tuition fee waiver.
 Tuition fee waiver is available for sibling

List of vice-chancellors 
 Prof. Dr. Md. Fayyaz Khan ( present )

Academics departments

Undergraduate programs

Faculty of Business 
 BBA (Major in Accounting, Finance, Marketing and HRM)

Faculty of Engineering & Applied Sciences 

 B.Sc. in civil engineering (Four-year Program)
 B.Sc. in civil engineering for Diploma Engineers
 B.Sc. in engineering. in EEE for Diploma Engineers
 B.Sc. Engineering. in CSE (Four-year Program)
 B.Sc. in textile engineering (Four-year Program)
 B.Sc. in textile engineering for Diploma Engineers
 B.Sc. Engineering. in CSE for Diploma Engineers
 B.Sc. Engineering. in EEE (Four-year Program)

Faculty of Arts & Humanities 
 BA (Hons.) in English

Faculty of Social Sciences 
 B.Sc. (Hons.) in economics

Faculty of Law 
 LL. B (Hons) (Four-year Program)

Graduate programs

Faculty of Business 
 EMBA (Major in Accounting, Finance, Marketing & HRM)
 MBM (Two year evening program)
 MBA (Major in Accounting, Finance, Marketing, Management & HRM)

Faculty of Arts & Humanities 
 M. A. in English (Two-year evening program)
 M. A. in English Language Teaching (ELT)

Faculty of Social Sciences 
 M.Sc. in economics (One-year evening program)

Faculty of Mathematical & Physical Science 
 M.Sc. in mathematics (General: Two-year evening program)
 M.Sc. in mathematics (General: One-year evening program)
 M.Sc. in mathematics (Thesis: Two-year evening program)

Faculty of Law 
 LL. M (One-year evening program)

Academic calendar 
BUBT follows a model of higher education consisting of semesters,  courses, credit hours,  continuous evaluation and letter grading.  The academic year begins from October and runs through September of the following year. An academic year is divided into the following three semesters:

 Fall : October - January
 Spring : February - May
 Summer : June - September

The semester duration is usually of fifteen weeks-thirteen weeks for classes and two weeks for final examination and result.

Students Life

Student organizations 
There are a number of student organizations in the university.
 𝗕𝗨𝗕𝗧 𝗧𝗲𝘅𝘁𝗶𝗹𝗲 𝗖𝗹𝘂𝗯.
 𝗕𝗨𝗕𝗧 𝗦𝗽𝗼𝗿𝘁𝘀 𝗖𝗹𝘂𝗯.
 𝗕𝗨𝗕𝗧 𝗘𝗘𝗘 𝗖𝗹𝘂𝗯.
 𝗕𝗨𝗕𝗧 𝗜𝗧 𝗖𝗹𝘂𝗯.
 𝗕𝗨𝗕𝗧 𝗘𝗰𝗼𝗻𝗼𝗺𝗶𝗰𝘀 𝗖𝗹𝘂𝗯.
 𝗕𝗨𝗕𝗧 𝗗𝗲𝗯𝗮𝘁𝗲 𝗖𝗹𝘂𝗯.
 𝗕𝗨𝗕𝗧 𝗕𝘂𝘀𝗶𝗻𝗲𝘀𝘀 𝗖𝗹𝘂𝗯.
 𝗕𝗨𝗕𝗧 𝗘𝗻𝗴𝗹𝗶𝘀𝗵 𝗟𝗮𝗻𝗴𝘂𝗮𝗴𝗲 𝗖𝗹𝘂𝗯.
 𝗕𝗨𝗕𝗧 𝗖𝘂𝗹𝘁𝘂𝗿𝗮𝗹 𝗖𝗹𝘂𝗯.
 𝗕𝗨𝗕𝗧 𝗦𝘁𝘂𝗱𝗲𝗻𝘁 𝗙𝗼𝗿𝘂𝗺.
 𝗕𝗨𝗕𝗧 𝗩𝗼𝗹𝘂𝗻𝘁𝗲𝗲𝗿.

Footnotes

External links
 BUBT Official Website
 BUBT at Gallery
  BUBT was approved by University Grants Commission of Bangladesh (UGC) 
 BUBT at Varsity Admission.com
 BUBT at Online-Dhaka.com
 BUBT at Gallery.com
 BUBT at VarsityNotice.com
 BUBT at Bangladesh Directory
 BUBT at 4International Colleges & Universities

 
Educational institutions established in 2003
Universities and colleges in Dhaka
Private universities in Bangladesh
2003 establishments in Bangladesh